Bob Sikes Airport , named for Robert L. F. Sikes, is a public-use airport located  northeast of the central business district of the city of Crestview in Okaloosa County, Florida, United States. The airport is publicly owned and supports a mix of general aviation and aerospace corporations performing modification work on military aircraft.  The airport sees frequent military training use by aircraft based at Eglin AFB, Duke Field, Hurlburt Field, NAS Pensacola, NAS Whiting Field and Fort Rucker.

References

External links

Airports in Florida
Transportation buildings and structures in Okaloosa County, Florida